This article chronicles the attested movements of the fourth-century Roman emperors Constantine II (referred to here as Constantinus), Constantius II (referred to here as Constantius), Constans, Gallus, and Julian the Apostate from 337 to 361 AD. It does not cover the imperial usurpers of the period, including Magnentius, Vetranio, Claudius Silvanus, and Poemenius. The chronology is principally derived from Timothy Barnes' Athanasius and Constantius. Substantial additions and further sources are based on recent research that seeks to go beyond Barnes' own chronology and slightly modifying his at a few places.

This article begins its coverage at the death of Constantine on 22 May 337. After an interregnum of three months, during or after which the army and its agents lynched other potential successors, the three sons of Constantine declared themselves Augusti on 9 September 337. Discarding their father's succession arrangements, the brothers divided the empire into three parts. Constantine II ruled the provinces of Gaul, Britain, Spain, and Germany from Trier. Constantius ruled the provinces of Asia Minor (the dioceses of Pontus and Asia), Thrace, the Levant and Egypt (the Diocese of the East) from Antioch. Constans ruled Italy, Africa, and the dioceses of Pannonia, Dacia, and Macedonia from Naissus.

In 340, Constantinus attempted to seize his brother Constans' territory, and was killed while reconnoitering Ravenna during the ensuing civil war. Constans acquired his territory, and ruled from Trier, Milan, and Sirmium. In January 350, Constans was overthrown at Autun and killed at Elne in a palace revolution instigated by Magnentius. Magnentius was defeated and killed in the summer of 353 at the Battle of Mons Seleucus, making Constantius the sole emperor.

From 351 to 359, Constantius ruled from Sirmium and Milan, and from Constantinople and Antioch. Constantius appointed Gallus Caesar (subordinate emperor) on 15 March 351, and delegated the rule of the eastern provinces to him. Gallus ruled from Antioch. He subsequently proved violent and cruel, and was recalled and executed in autumn 354. Constantius appointed Julian, the last surviving male relative of Constantine other than himself, Caesar on 6 November 355. Julian ruled the western provinces from Vienne, Sens, and Paris. To address Persian influence and aggression on the eastern frontier, Constantius ruled from Antioch from 360 until his death.

Julian's troops proclaimed him Augustus in February 360. Constantius did not recognize Julian's claim to the title, but was detained from campaigning against him by Persian raids. Constantius died on 3 November 361 after declaring Julian his successor. Julian was sole emperor from Constantius' death until his own death in 363. This article ends its coverage at Julian's death on 26 June 363. For a further timeline until 426, consult Matthews, John. Western Aristocracies and Imperial Court A.D. 364–425. Oxford: Clarendon Press; New York: Oxford University Press, 1975.

A † indicates that a date or an event is uncertain. A superscript S indicates that the manuscript is corrupt, and has been emended to follow Otto Seeck's corrections in his edition of the Codex Theodosianus. Manuscript details are given in brackets (as "mss. date" or "mss. year", etc.) for all emended texts. Unsourced events are purely conjectural. Note that some are based on triangulation of different sources and can be, as such, somewhat inexact. These cases have been noted.

Constantinus II

Constantius II

Constans

Gallus

Julian

References

Ancient sources

Ammianus Marcellinus. Res Gestae.
Yonge, Charles Duke, trans. Roman History. London: Bohn, 1862. Online at Tertullian. Retrieved 27 December 2014.
Rolfe, J.C., trans. History. 3 vols. Loeb ed. London: Heinemann, 1939–52. Online at LacusCurtius. Retrieved 27 December 2014.
Hamilton, Walter, trans. The Later Roman Empire (A.D. 354–378). Harmondsworth: Penguin, 1986. [Abridged edition]
Athanasius of Alexandria.
Festal Index.
Atkinson, M., and Archibald Robertson, trans. Festal Letters. From Nicene and Post-Nicene Fathers, Second Series, Vol. 4. Edited by Philip Schaff and Henry Wace. Buffalo, NY: Christian Literature Publishing Co., 1892. Revised and edited for New Advent by Kevin Knight. Online at Christian Classics Ethereal Library. Retrieved 27 December 2014.
Epistula encyclica (Encyclical letter). Summer 339.
Atkinson, M., and Archibald Robertson, trans. Encyclical letter. From Nicene and Post-Nicene Fathers, Second Series, Vol. 4. Edited by Philip Schaff and Henry Wace. Buffalo, NY: Christian Literature Publishing Co., 1892. Revised and edited for New Advent by Kevin Knight. Online at New Advent and Christian Classics Ethereal Library. Retrieved 27 December 2014.
Apologia Contra Arianos (Defense against the Arians). 349.
Atkinson, M., and Archibald Robertson, trans. Apologia Contra Arianos. From Nicene and Post-Nicene Fathers, Second Series, Vol. 4. Edited by Philip Schaff and Henry Wace. Buffalo, NY: Christian Literature Publishing Co., 1892. Revised and edited for New Advent by Kevin Knight. Online at New Advent. Retrieved 28 December 2014.
Apologia ad Constantium (Defense before Constantius). 353.
Atkinson, M., and Archibald Robertson, trans. Apologia ad Constantium. From Nicene and Post-Nicene Fathers, Second Series, Vol. 4. Edited by Philip Schaff and Henry Wace. Buffalo, NY: Christian Literature Publishing Co., 1892. Revised and edited for New Advent by Kevin Knight. Online at New Advent. Retrieved 28 December 2014.
Historia Arianorum (History of the Arians). 357.
Atkinson, M., and Archibald Robertson, trans. Historia Arianorum. From Nicene and Post-Nicene Fathers, Second Series, Vol. 4. Edited by Philip Schaff and Henry Wace. Buffalo, NY: Christian Literature Publishing Co., 1892. Revised and edited for New Advent by Kevin Knight. Online at New Advent. Retrieved 29 December 2014.
De Synodis (On the Councils of Arminium and Seleucia). Autumn 359.
Newman, John Henry and Archibald Robertson, trans. De Synodis. From Nicene and Post-Nicene Fathers, Second Series, Vol. 4. Edited by Philip Schaff and Henry Wace. Buffalo, NY: Christian Literature Publishing Co., 1892. Revised and edited for New Advent by Kevin Knight. Online at New Advent. Retrieved 29 December 2014.
Historia acephala. 368 – c. 420.
Robertson, Archibald, trans. Historia Acephala. From Nicene and Post-Nicene Fathers, Second Series, Vol. 4. Edited by Philip Schaff and Henry Wace. Buffalo, NY: Christian Literature Publishing Co., 1892. Revised and edited for New Advent by Kevin Knight. Online at New Advent and Christian Classics Ethereal Library. Retrieved 29 December 2014.
Chronica minora 1, 2.
Mommsen, T., ed. Chronica Minora saec. IV, V, VI, VII 1, 2 (in Latin). Monumenta Germaniae Historia, Auctores Antiquissimi 9, 11. Berlin, 1892, 1894. Retrieved 27 December 2014.
Codex Theodosianus.
Mommsen, T. and Paul M. Meyer, eds. Theodosiani libri XVI cum Constitutionibus Sirmondianis et Leges novellae ad Theodosianum pertinentes2 (in Latin). Berlin: Weidmann, [1905] 1954. Compiled by Nicholas Palmer, revised by Tony Honoré for Oxford Text Archive, 1984. Prepared for online use by R.W.B. Salway, 1999. Preface, books 1–8. Online at University College London and the University of Grenoble. Retrieved 29 December 2014.
Unknown edition (in Latin). Online at AncientRome.ru. Retrieved 27 December 2014.
Codex Justinianus.
Scott, Samuel P., trans. The Code of Justinian, in The Civil Law. 17 vols. 1932. Online at the Constitution Society. Retrieved 28 December 2014.
Ephraem the Syrian. Carmina Nisibena (Songs of Nisibis).
Stopford, J.T. Sarsfield, trans. The Nisibene Hymns. From Nicene and Post-Nicene Fathers, Second Series, Vol. 13. Edited by Philip Schaff and Henry Wace. Buffalo, NY: Christian Literature Publishing Co., 1890. Revised and edited for New Advent by Kevin Knight. Online at New Advent. Retrieved 27 December 2014.
Bickell, Gustav, trans. S. Ephraemi Syri Carmina Nisibena: additis prolegomenis et supplemento lexicorum Syriacorum (in Latin). Lipetsk: Brockhaus, 1866. Online at Google Books. Retrieved 27 December 2014.
Epitome de Caesaribus.
Banchich, Thomas M., trans. A Booklet About the Style of Life and the Manners of the Imperatores. Canisius College Translated Texts 1. Buffalo, NY: Canisius College, 2009. Online at De Imperatoribus Romanis. Retrieved 28 December 2014.
Eusebius of Caesarea.
Oratio de Laudibus Constantini (Oration in Praise of Constantine, sometimes the Tricennial Oration).
Richardson, Ernest Cushing, trans. Oration in Praise of Constantine. From Nicene and Post-Nicene Fathers, Second Series, Vol. 1. Edited by Philip Schaff and Henry Wace. Buffalo, NY: Christian Literature Publishing Co., 1890. Revised and edited for New Advent by Kevin Knight. Online at New Advent. Retrieved 26 December 2014.
Vita Constantini (Life of Constantine).
Richardson, Ernest Cushing, trans. Life of Constantine. From Nicene and Post-Nicene Fathers, Second Series, Vol. 1. Edited by Philip Schaff and Henry Wace. Buffalo, NY: Christian Literature Publishing Co., 1890. Revised and edited for New Advent by Kevin Knight. Online at New Advent. Retrieved 27 December 2014.
Festus. Breviarium.
Banchich, Thomas M., and Jennifer A. Meka, trans. Breviarium of the Accomplishments of the Roman People. Canisius College Translated Texts 2. Buffalo, NY: Canisius College, 2001. Online at De Imperatoribus Romanis. Retrieved 28 December 2014.
Firmicus Maternus. De errore profanarum religionum (On the error of profane religions).
Baluzii and Rigaltii, eds. Divi Cæcilii Cypriani, Carthaginensis Episcopi, Opera Omnia; accessit J. Firmici Materni, Viri Clarissimi, De Errore Profanarum Religionum (in Latin). Paris: Gauthier Brothers and the Society of Booksellers, 1836. Online at Google Books. Retrieved 28 December 2014.
Hilary of Poitiers. Ad Constantium (To Constantius).
Feder, Alfred Leonhard, ed. S. Hilarii episcopi Pictaviensis Tractatus mysteriorum. Collectanea Antiariana Parisina (fragmenta historica) cum appendice (liber I Ad Constantium). Liber ad Constantium imperatorem (Liber II ad Constantium). Hymni. Fragmenta minora. Spuria (in Latin). In the Corpus Scriptorum Ecclesiasticorum Latinorum, Vol. 65. Vienna: Tempsky, 1916.
Itinerarium Alexandri (Itinerary of Alexander).
Mai, Angelo, ed. Itinerarium Alexandri ad Constantium Augustum, Constantini M. Filium (in Latin). Regiis Typis, 1818. Online at Google Books. Retrieved 27 December 2014.
Davies, Iolo, trans. Itinerary of Alexander. 2009. Online at DocStoc. Retrieved 27 December 2014.
Jerome.
Chronicon (Chronicle).
Pearse, Roger, et al., trans. The Chronicle of St. Jerome, in Early Church Fathers: Additional Texts. Tertullian, 2005. Online at Tertullian. Retrieved 27 December 2014.
de Viris Illustribus (On Illustrious Men).
Richardson, Ernest Cushing, trans. De Viris Illustribus (On Illustrious Men). From Nicene and Post-Nicene Fathers, Second Series, Vol. 3. Edited by Philip Schaff and Henry Wace. Buffalo, NY: Christian Literature Publishing Co., 1892. Revised and edited for New Advent by Kevin Knight. Online at New Advent. Retrieved 28 December 2014.
Julian.
Wright, Wilmer Cave, trans. Works of the Emperor Julian. 3 vols. Loeb ed. London: Heinemann, 1913. Online at the Internet Archive: Vol. 1, 2, 3.
Libanius. Oratio 59 (Oration 59).
M.H. Dodgeon, trans. The Sons of Constantine: Libanius Or. LIX. In From Constantine to Julian: Pagan and Byzantine Views, A Source History, edited by S.N.C. Lieu and Dominic Montserrat, 164–205. London: Routledge, 1996. 
Origo Constantini Imperatoris.
Rolfe, J.C., trans. Excerpta Valesiana, in vol. 3 of Rolfe's translation of Ammianus Marcellinus' History. Loeb ed. London: Heinemann, 1952. Online at LacusCurtius. Retrieved 28 December 2014.
Papyri Abinnaeus.
The Abinnaeus Archive: Papers of a Roman Officer in the Reign of Constantius II (in Greek). Duke Data Bank of Documentary Papyri. Online at Perseus and the Duke Data Bank. Retrieved 27 December 2014.
Papyri Laurentius.
Dai Papiri della Biblioteca Medicea Laurenziana (in Greek). Duke Data Bank of Documentary Papyri. Online at Perseus and the Duke Data Bank. Retrieved 27 December 2014.
Philostorgius. Historia Ecclesiastica.
Walford, Edward, trans. Epitome of the Ecclesiastical History of Philostorgius, Compiled by Photius, Patriarch of Constantinople. London: Henry G. Bohn, 1855. Online at Tertullian. Retrieved 26 December 2014.
Socrates. Historia Ecclesiastica (History of the Church).
Zenos, A.C., trans. Ecclesiastical History. From Nicene and Post-Nicene Fathers, Second Series, Vol. 2. Edited by Philip Schaff and Henry Wace. Buffalo, NY: Christian Literature Publishing Co., 1890. Revised and edited for New Advent by Kevin Knight. Online at New Advent. Retrieved 27 December 2014.
Sozomen. Historia Ecclesiastica (History of the Church).
Hartranft, Chester D. Ecclesiastical History. From Nicene and Post-Nicene Fathers, Second Series, Vol. 2. Edited by Philip Schaff and Henry Wace. Buffalo, NY: Christian Literature Publishing Co., 1890. Revised and edited for New Advent by Kevin Knight. Online at New Advent. Retrieved 27 December 2014.
Sulpicius Severus. Sacred History.
Roberts, Alexander, trans. Sacred History. From Nicene and Post-Nicene Fathers, Second Series, Vol. 11. Edited by Philip Schaff and Henry Wace. Buffalo, NY: Christian Literature Publishing Co., 1894. Revised and edited for New Advent by Kevin Knight. Online at New Advent. Retrieved 28 December 2014.
Theodoret. Historia Ecclesiastica (History of the Church).
Jackson, Blomfield, trans. Ecclesiastical History. From Nicene and Post-Nicene Fathers, Second Series, Vol. 3. Edited by Philip Schaff and Henry Wace. Buffalo, NY: Christian Literature Publishing Co., 1892. Revised and edited for New Advent by Kevin Knight. Online at New Advent. Retrieved 28 December 2014.
Themistius. Orationes (Orations).

Zosimos. Historia Nova (New History).
Unknown trans. The History of Count Zosimus. London: Green and Champlin, 1814. Online at Tertullian. Retrieved 28 December 2014. [An unsatisfactory edition. Consult TLG version for original language]
Unknown trans. Histoire Nouvelle and ΖΩΣΙΜΟΥ ΚΟΜΙΤΟΣ ΚΑΙ ΑΠΟΦΙΣΚΟΣΥΝΗΓΟΡΟΥ (in French and Greek). Online at the Catholic University of Louvain. Retrieved 27 December 2014.

Modern sources

Barnes, Timothy D. "Imperial Chronology, A.D. 337–350." Phoenix 34:2 (1980): 160–66.
Barnes, Timothy D. "The Career of Abinnaeus." Phoenix 39:4 (1985): 368–74.
Barnes, Timothy D. "Ammianus Marcellinus and His World." Classical Philology 88:1 (1993): 55–70.
Barnes, Timothy D. Athanasius and Constantius: Theology and Politics in the Constantinian Empire. Cambridge, MA: Harvard University Press, 1993.
Callu, Jean-Paul. "Un 'Miroir des Princes': Le 'Basilikos' libanien de 348" (in French). Gerión 5 (1987): 133–52. Online at the Universidad Complutense Madrid.
Jones, A.H.M. The Later Roman Empire 284–602: A Social, Economic, and Administrative Survey. London: Basil Blackwell, 1964, 3 vols.; rept. Baltimore: Johns Hopkins, 1986, 2 vols.
Matthews, John. The Roman Empire of Ammianus. London: Duckworth, 1989.
Heather, Peter, and David Moncur, ed. and trans. Politics, Philosophy, and Empire in the Fourth Century: Selected Orations of Themistius. Liverpool: Liverpool University Press, 2002.
Seeck, Otto. Die Briefe des Libanius zeitlich geordnet (in German). Leipzig: J.C. Hinrichs, 1906. Online at the Internet Archive. Retrieved 28 December 2014.
Vanderspoel, John. Themistius and the Imperial Court: Oratory, Civic Duty, and Paideia from Constantius to Theodosius. Ann Arbor: University of Michigan Press, 1995.

Notes

Citations

4th-century Romans
Constantinian dynasty
Roman emperors
Roman emperors